The following is a sortable table of all songs by Knuckle Puck:

The column Song list the song title.
The column Writer(s) lists who wrote the song.
The column Album lists the album the song is featured on.
The column Producer lists the producer of the song.
The column Year lists the year in which the song was released.
The column Length list the length/duration of the song.

Studio recordings

See also
 Knuckle Puck discography

References
 Footnotes
Bonus tracks on the deluxe edition of The Weight That You Buried, released through Glamour Kills.
Bonus track on the reissue of Don't Come Home, released through Bad Timing.
Later included on the Japanese-only compilation 2012–2013 Mixtape (2014).

 Citations

Knuckle Puck